Jiayu Pass or  is the first frontier fortress at the west end of the Ming dynasty Great Wall, near the city of Jiayuguan in Gansu province. Along with Juyong Pass and Shanhai Pass, it is one of the main passes of the Great Wall. In the Ming period, foreign merchants and envoys from the Central Asia and West Asia mostly entered China through Jiayu Pass.

Location
The structure lies between two hills, one of which dominates Jiayuguan Pass. The fortress was built near an oasis that was then on the extreme western edge of China.

Description

There are two gates: one on the east side of the pass and the other on the west side. On each gate there is a building. An inscription of "Jiayuguan" in Chinese is written on a tablet at the building at the west gate. The south and north sides of the pass are connected to the Great Wall. There is a turret on each corner of the pass. On the north side, inside the two gates, there are wide roads leading to the top of the pass.

Jiayuguan consisted of three defense lines: an inner fort, an outer fort, and a moat.

When famous traveler Mildred Cable first visited Jiayuguan in 1923, she described it as

To the north of the central arch was a turreted watch-tower, and from it the long line of the wall dipped into a valley, climbed a hill and vanished over its summit. Then a few poplar trees came in sight, and it was evident from the shade of green at the foot of the wall that here was grass and water. Farther on a patch of wild irises spread a carpet of blue by the roadside, just where the cart passed under an ornamental memorial arch and lurched across a rickety bridge over a bubbling stream.

Legend and history

A fabulous legend recounts the meticulous planning involved in the construction of the pass. According to legend, when Jiayuguan was being planned, the official in charge asked the designer to estimate the exact number of bricks required and the designer gave him a number (99,999). The official questioned his judgment, asking him if that would be enough, so the designer added one brick. When Jiayuguan was finished, there was one brick left over, which was placed loose on one of the gates where it remains today.

The structure was built during the early Ming dynasty, sometime around the year 1372. The fortress there was greatly strengthened due to fear of an invasion by Timur, but Timur died of old age while leading an army toward China.

Significance

Among the passes on the Great Wall, Jiayuguan is the most intact surviving ancient military building. The pass is also known by the name the "First and Greatest Pass Under Heaven", which is not to be confused with the "First Pass Under Heaven", a name for Shanhaiguan at the east end of the Great Wall near Qinhuangdao, Hebei.

The pass was a key waypoint of the ancient Silk Road.

Jiayuguan has a somewhat fearsome reputation because Chinese people who were banished were ordered to leave through Jiayuguan for the west, the vast majority never to return. Mildred Cable noted in her memoirs that it was

known to men of a former generation as Kweimenkwan (Gate of the Demons)....The most important door was on the farther side of the fortress, and it might be called Traveller's Gate, though some spoke of it as the Gate of Sighs. It was a deep archway tunnelled in the thickness of the wall.... Every traveller toward the north-west passed through this gate, and it opened out on that great and always mysterious waste called the Desert of Gobi. The long archway was covered with writings...the work of men of scholarship, who had fallen on an hour of deep distress. Who were then the writers of this Anthology of Grief? Some were heavy-hearted exiles, others were disgraced officials, and some were criminals no longer tolerated within China's borders. Torn from all they loved on earth and banished with dishonoured name to the dreary regions outside.

Amongst those once banished in disgrace was the famous Chinese Opium War Viceroy of Liangguang, Commissioner Lin Zexu, who died in Ürümqi where a statue in his honor can today be found in a local park. 

More famous in Jiayuguan are the thousands of tombs from the Wei and Western Jin dynasty (266–420) discovered east of the city in recent years. The 700 excavated tombs are famous in China, and replicas or photographs of them can be seen in nearly every major Chinese museum. The bricks deserve their fame; they are both fascinating and charming, depicting such domestic scenes as preparing for a feast, roasting meat, picking mulberries, feeding chickens, and herding horses. Of the 18 tombs that have been excavated, only one is currently open to tourists. Many frescos have also been found around Jiayuguan but most are not open to visitors.

Photos

References

External links

 Complete Tour of JiaYuGuan Fortress Scenic Spot
 Complete Map of JiaYuGuan Fortress Scenic Spot 
 A modern traveller's description of a recent visit can be found in PASSAGE, a publication of the Singapore Asian Civilisations Museum  

Major National Historical and Cultural Sites in Gansu
Geography of Gansu
Great Wall of China
Mountain passes of China

Jiayuguan City
Ming dynasty architecture

pt:Jiayuguan